Julien Ravier (born 16 February 1978) is a French Republican politician who has been the Member of Parliament for Bouches-du-Rhône's 1st constituency since 2020.

Early life 
Ravier was born in Marseille.

Career 
Ravier replaced Valérie Boyer in the National Assembly when she was elected in the 2020 French Senate election. As her substitute, Ravier took her seat in the Assembly.

Due to a court decision, he is ineligible to run for re-election in the 2022 French legislative election.

References

See also 

 List of deputies of the 15th National Assembly of France

Living people
1978 births
Politicians from Marseille
The Republicans (France) politicians
Deputies of the 15th National Assembly of the French Fifth Republic
Members of Parliament for Bouches-du-Rhône